Cnicothamnus is a genus of flowering plants in the family Asteraceae. Its species are small trees which can reach 5m in height, bearing alternate ovate and dentate leaves with a whitish pubescence. The inflorescences, borne at branch tips, are bell-shaped capitula of a bright orange colour, and usually appear during local winter. Their fruit (which can be described as a cypsela) bears a rough plume.

 Species
 Cnicothamnus azafran, native to Argentina, Bolivia, and Paraguay
 Cnicothamnus lorentzii, native to Argentina and Bolivia

References

Gochnatioideae
Asteraceae genera
Flora of South America